The Indians in China are migrants from India to China and their descendants. Historically, Indians played a major role in disseminating Buddhism in China. In modern times, there is a large long-standing community of Indians living in Hong Kong, often for descendants with several generations of roots and a growing population of students, traders and employees in Mainland China. The majority of Indians are East Indian Bengali, Bihari as well as a high proportion of North Indians (including Rajputs, Marathas and Punjabis).

History

Antiquity and Middle Ages
In the Records of the Grand Historian, Zhang Qian (d. 113 BC) and Sima Qian (145-90 BC) make references to "Shendu 身毒", which may have been referring to the Indus Valley (the Sindh province in modern Pakistan), originally known as "Sindhu" in Sanskrit. When Yunnan was annexed by the Han Dynasty in the first century, Chinese authorities reported an Indian "Shendu" community living there. After the transmission of Buddhism from India to China from the first century onwards, many Indian scholars and monks travelled to China, such as Batuo (fl. 464-495 AD)—founder of the Shaolin Monastery—and Bodhidharma—founder of Chan/Zen Buddhism. There was also a large Tamil Indian community in Quanzhou city and Jinjiang district who built more than a dozen Hindu temples or shrines, including two grand big temples in Quanzhou city. In 1271, a visiting Italian merchant recorded that the Indians “were recognised easily.” “These rich Indian men and women mainly live on vegetables, milk and rice,” he wrote. The mass foreign influx forced all locals of Quanzhou to immigrate to Fuzhou or Ningde to get away from the indians and other foreigners, while only Quanzhou's Tanka untouchables remained. As retribution for supporting the Ispah rebellion, Chen's provincial armies exterminated most of the Tamil Indians, the small remainder of them who survived were deported to other parts of the Quanzhou region like Jinjiang or Nan'an or further south of Fujian. Many Indians gave their children to local farmers to save them from slaughter where they were raised up as Hokkiens.

Colonial Era
Indians (as well as people from elsewhere in the Portuguese colonial empire) were among the crew of the Portuguese ships trading on the Chinese coast
beginning in the sixteenth century. For example, Galeote Pereira, one of the Portuguese smugglers captured off the Fujian coast in 1549 and exiled to Guangxi, mentions Gujarati servants among his companions.
In the same century Indians from former Portuguese Indian Colonies (notably Goa) settled in Macau in small numbers.

The history of the Indians in Hong Kong could be drawn back since the day of British occupation. When the Union flag of the United Kingdom was hoisted on 26 January 1841, there were around 2,700 Indian troops participated. They had played an important role for the development of Hong Kong in early days. The most mentionable were the contributions of the set up of the University of Hong Kong (HKU)  and the Hong Kong and Shanghai Banking Corporation (HSBC). Also, the Star Ferry was founded by Indians in 1888. In 1952, business leaders of the Indian community have founded The Indian Chamber of Commerce Hong Kong (ICCHK). It aimed at promoting and improving the image of India trade in Hong Kong and southern China.

People's Republic of China (Mainland China)
The number in the Mainland is growing rapidly with the Sixth National Population Census of the People's Republic of China recording 15,051 Indian nationals living in mainland China as of 2010. Other sources report more with a columnist for the Economic Times stating that the number of Indians in China was 45-48,000 in 2015. Many Indians in China are students, traders and professionals employed with MNCs, Indian companies and banks. There are three Indian community associations in the country.

Medical Students
There are a total 23,000 Indian students in China in 2019 and among them 21,000 study medicine. Students from Andhra Pradesh are particularly well represented with 5,000 medical students in China reported in 2011.

The growth of Indian medical students at Chinese medical universities started in 2003 after the Medical Council of India (MCI) accepted Chinese medical degrees for qualification in India. For the academic year 2019-20, MCI recognised English language degrees from 45 universities and colleges in China. Chinese medical schools are attractive because of better infrastructure, labs and equipment, and lower cost with annual tuition around $4,000 in 2020, about half of the cost of private medical schools in India.

Hong Kong

Most Indians stepped into the fields like international companies, banking, airlines, travel agents, medical, media and insurance sector. The banking and financial sector had the strongest presence of Indian professionals. Information technology and telecommunications have also interested highly qualified Indians. In the 1950s, tailoring had become an industry that was popular with Indians and around 200 tailoring shops were owned by them at that time.

Republic of China (Taiwan, Penghu, Kinmen and Matsu)

Indian culture
The Indian Embassy has been organising the Festival of India in China over the years. An important component of it has been the food festivals held in Indian restaurants, spread over nearly 45 Chinese cities.

Notable people

Ancient
 Amoghavajra - One of the most politically powerful Buddhist monks in Chinese history.
Bodhidharma - founder of shaolin monastery and zen Buddhism in China. 

 Bodhiruci - Buddhist monk and esoteric master from India.
 Batuo - First abbot of Shaolin Monastery.
 Kumārajīva - Kuchean Buddhist monk.
 Huili - Indian Buddhist monk and founder of the Lingyin temple.
 Gautama Siddha - Chinese translator, astronomer, astrologer and compiler.

See also
 Dwarkanath Kotnis - One of five Indian physicians dispatched to China during the Second Sino-Japanese War
 Chinas
 Chinese people in India
 Chindian people
 Chindian cuisine
 Indians in Korea
 Hinduism in China
 Pakistanis in China
 Sino-Indian relations

References

 
Ethnic groups in China